Kirchlengern is a municipality in the district of Herford, in North Rhine-Westphalia, Germany.

Geography

Kirchlengern is situated on the river Else, approx. 10 km north of Herford.

Neighbouring places
 Hüllhorst
 Löhne
 Hiddenhausen
 Bünde

Division of the municipality
The municipality is divided in 7 districts:
 Häver (1,900 inhabitants)
 Kirchlengern (6,051 inhabitants)
 Klosterbauerschaft (2,568 inhabitants)
 Quernheim (1,549 inhabitants)
 Rehmerloh (203 inhabitants)
 Stift Quernheim (1,668 inhabitants)
 Südlengern (3,154 inhabitants)

Mayors
 since 2004:   Rüdiger Meier (CDU)
 1999-2004:   Werner Helmke (SPD)

Notable people
 1833–1900, Ernst Heinrich Lindemann, politician
 1924–2003, Hellmuth Buddenberg, manager
 1942–2017, Gunter Gabriel, singer
 1953, Jürgen Klute, politician
 1953, Reinhard Göhner, politician
 1958, Elke Kruse, artist
 1984, David Odonkor, footballer

References

External links
  

Herford (district)